The Brooks Range (Gwich'in: Gwazhał) is a mountain range in far northern North America stretching some  from west to east across northern Alaska into Canada's Yukon Territory.

In the United States, these mountains are considered a subrange of the Rocky Mountains, whereas in Canada they are considered separate, as the northern border of the Rocky Mountains is considered to be the Liard River far to the south in the province of British Columbia.

While the range is mostly uninhabited, the Dalton Highway and Trans-Alaska Pipeline System run through the Atigun Pass (1,415 m, 4,643 ft) on their way to the oil fields at Prudhoe Bay on Alaska's North Slope. The Alaska Native villages of Anaktuvuk and Arctic Village, as well as the very small communities of Coldfoot, Wiseman, Bettles, and Chandalar, are the range's only settlements. In the far west, near the Wulik River in the De Long Mountains is the Red Dog mine, the largest zinc mine in the world.

The range was named by the United States Board on Geographic Names in 1925 after Alfred Hulse Brooks, chief USGS geologist for Alaska from 1903 to 1924.

Various historical records also referred to the range as the Arctic Mountains, Hooper Mountains, Meade Mountains and Meade River Mountains. The Canadian portion of the range is officially called the British Mountains. Ivvavik National Park is located in Canada's British Mountains.

Peaks

 Mount Isto 
 Mount Hubley 
 Mount Chamberlin 
 Mount Michelson at 8,855 ft (2,699 m)
 The Gates of Kiev at 7,775 ft (2,370 m), the highest point in the central part of the range
 Black Mountain at 5,020 ft (1,530 m), the highest point in the far western part of the range.
 Mount Doonerak 
 Mount Igikpak 
 Frigid Crags West Gate 
 Boreal Mountain East Gate 
 Limestack Mountain 
 Cockedhat Mountain

History
Bob Marshall explored the North Fork Koyukuk River area of the range in 1929.  He named Mount Doonerak, explaining "the name Doonerak I took from an Eskimo word which means a spirit or, as they would translate it, a devil."  Marshall described the mountain as, a "towering, black, unscalable-looking giant, the highest peak in this section of the Brooks Range."

Ecology

The Brooks Range forms the northernmost drainage divide in North America, separating streams flowing into the Arctic Ocean and the North Pacific. The range roughly delineates the summer position of the Arctic front. It represents the northern extent of the tree line, with little beyond isolated balsam poplar stands occurring north of the continental drainage divide. Trembling aspen and white spruce also occur north of the Brooks Range, though they are limited to sites that have been disturbed by human activity. Southern slopes have some cover of black spruce, Picea mariana, marking the northern limit of those trees. As the global mean temperature increases, tree line has been observed to move further north, changing the boundaries of where these trees are found. An increase in shrub abundance is also being experienced in areas which were previously dominated by tundra, impacting the ecology of the area.

As one of the most remote and least-disturbed wildernesses of North America, the mountains are home to Dall sheep, grizzly bears, black bear, gray wolf, moose and porcupine caribou.

In Alaska, the Western Arctic Caribou herd (490,000 strong in 2004) traverses the Brooks Range in its annual migration.  The smaller Central Arctic herd (32,000 in 2002), as well as the 123,000 animal Porcupine Caribou herd, likewise migrate through the Brooks range on their annual journeys in and out of the Arctic National Wildlife Refuge.  The migration path of the Porcupine Caribou herd is the longest of any terrestrial mammal on earth.

Paleontology

Because the rocks of the range were formed in an ancient seabed, the Brooks Range contains fossils of marine organisms. In addition to the coral fossils shown, trilobites and brachiopods from the middle Cambrian have been found in the sandy limestones of the Central Brooks Range.

Remains of a woolly mammoth that died about 17,100 years ago were found north of the Brooks Range. A research report on its movement range was published in 2021.

Climate
Due to a changing climate, between the years 1969–2018 the Eastern and Western portions of the Brooks Range have experienced a 17.2% increase in annual precipitation.

Polar amplification is a force experienced in this region as global temperatures are rising. The northern and western regions of Alaska, where the Brooks Range lies, is experiencing a warming rate twice that of southeastern Alaska. The Brooks Range has experienced an increase in average summer temperature between 4.2 °F and 5.8 °F between the years 1969–2018.

In certain areas of the Brooks Range, year round snow cover or "perennial snowfields", can be found. In 1985, 34 square miles of snowfields were recorded, where as that number has dropped to under four square miles in 2017.

Films
2007 - Gates of the Arctic: Alaska's Brooks Range
2008 - Alone Across Alaska: 1,000 Miles of Wilderness
2011 - The Edge of the Earth (short film)
2014 - The World Beyond the World (short film)

See also
Philip Smith Mountains
Richardson Mountains

Notes

Further reading
Allan, C. (2013). Arctic citadel : a history of exploration in the Brooks Range region of Northern Alaska. Washington, D.C,: U.S. Department of the Interior, National Park Service.
Witmer, Dennis "Far to the North: Photographs from the Brooks Range" Far to the North Press (2008) 
Kauffmann, John M. "Alaska's Brooks Range: The Ultimate Mountains" (Second Edition) Mountaineers Books (2005) 
Brown, William E. "History of the Central Brooks Range: Gaunt Beauty, Tenuous Life" University of Alaska Press (2007) 
Cooper, David "Brooks Range Passage" Mountaineers Books (1983) 
Dover, J.H., I.L. Tailleur, and J.A. Dumoulin. (2004). Geologic and fossil locality maps of the west-central part of the Howard Pass quadrangle and part of the adjacent Misheguk Mountain quadrangle, Western Brooks Range, Alaska [Miscellaneous Field Studies; Map MF-2413]. Reston, Va.: U.S. Department of the Interior, U.S. Geological Survey.
Krumhardt, A.P., A.G. Harris, and K.F. Watts. (1996). Lithostratigraphy, microlithofacies, and conodont biostratigraphy and biofacies of the Wahoo Limestone (Carboniferous), eastern Sadlerochit Mountains, northeast Brooks Range, Alaska U.S. Geological Survey Professional Paper 1568. Washington, D.C.: U.S. Department of the Interior, U.S. Geological Survey.
Marshall, R. (1970). Alaska wilderness; exploring the Central Brooks Range 2nd ed. Berkeley: University of California Press. 
Mayfield, C.F. et al. (1984). Reconnaissance geologic map of southeastern Misheguk Mountain quadrangle, Alaska [Miscellaneous Investigations Series Map I-1503]. Reston, Va.: U.S. Department of the Interior, U.S. Geological Survey.
Morin, R.L. (1997). Gravity and magnetic maps of part of the Drenchwater Creek stratiform zinc-lead-silver deposit, Howard Pass quadrangle, northwestern Brooks Range, Alaska [Open-file report 97-705]. Menlo Park, CA: U.S. Department of the Interior, U.S. Geological Survey.
Morin, R.L. (1997). Gravity models of Abby Creek and Bion barite deposits, Howard Pass quadrangle, northwestern Brooks Range, Alaska [U.S. Geological Survey Open-file Report 97-704]. Menlo Park, CA: U.S. Department of the Interior, U.S. Geological Survey.
Mull, C.G. et al. (1994). Geologic map of the Killik River quadrangle, Brooks Range, Alaska [U.S. Geological Survey Open-file Report 94-679]. Reston, Va: U.S. Department of the Interior, U.S. Geological Survey.
Nelson, P.H. et al. (2006). Potential tight gas resources in a frontier province, Jurassic through Tertiary strata beneath the Brooks Range foothills, Arctic Alaska U.S. Geological Survey Open-file Report 2006–1172. Reston, VA: U.S. Department of the Interior, U.S. Geological Survey.
U.S. Department of the Interior, U.S. Geological Survey. (2003). The natural dispersal of metals to the environment in the Wulik River-Ikalukrok Creek area, western Brooks Range, Alaska U.S. Geological Survey Fact Sheet 107–03. Reston, VA: author.
U.S. Department of the Interior, U.S. Geological Survey. (1995). Natural environmental effects of silver-lead-zinc deposits in the Brooks Range, Alaska U.S. Geological Survey Fact Sheet 092–95. Reston, VA: author.

 
Landforms of Yukon–Koyukuk Census Area, Alaska
Mountain ranges of Yukon
Mountains of North Slope Borough, Alaska
Mountains of Northwest Arctic Borough, Alaska
Mountains of Unorganized Borough, Alaska